Nāhiku is a small unincorporated community in eastern Maui, Hawaii.
Village has two parts: Upper Nāhiku closer to the road and Lower Nāhiku near the ocean shore.

Nāhiku is usually reached by Nāhiku Road coming down from the Hana Road to Opuhano Point on Honolulunui Bay.

The wooden bridge to the Nāhiku ocean shore within the last half mile of the road was closed to motor vehicles in 2014.

Some Nāhiku residents have been upset at tourist traffic after the area started appearing in Maui, Hawaii tourism guide books and web sites.

References

Unincorporated communities in Maui County, Hawaii
Populated places on Maui
Unincorporated communities in Hawaii